Carlo Monticelli (born September 9, 1960) is, since 18 December 2022, Governor of the  Council of Europe Development Bank, appointed for a five-year term.

Prior to this, he was Vice-Governor for Financial Strategy at the said Bank. From 2008 to 2015 he served as Director-General for International Financial Relations at the Treasury Department of the Italian Ministry of the Economy and Finance. In this position, Monticelli served also as Alternate Governor for Italy at the World Bank, the Asian Development Bank and the African Development Bank.

References 

Italian bankers
Italian civil servants
Living people
1960 births